Somsili or Samsili may refer to:
 Somsili, Hormozgan
 Samsili, Kerman